Ollie Wright (born 1 March 1999) is an English professional footballer who plays as an attacking midfielder for Huntsville City FC in the MLS Next Pro.

Career

Youth
Born in London, England, Wright spent time in the academy system's of Fulham and Brentford.

College and amateur
In 2016, Wright moved to the United States to play college soccer at St. Mary's University, Texas. Wright made 55 appearances, scoring 13 goals and tallying 20 assists over 3 seasons with the Rattlers. During his time in college, Wright was named All-Heartland Conference Third Team in 2018, and in 2019 was named Lone Star Conference Player of the Year, Lone Star Conference Midfielder of the Year, South Central Region Player of the Year and D2CCA and United Soccer Coaches All-American.

In 2019, Wright played with USL League Two side Corpus Christi FC, where he scored 7 goals and 15 assists in just 14 appearances, setting the League Two single-season assist record.

Professional
On 15 December 2020, it was announced Wright would join USL Championship side San Antonio FC on a 2-year deal ahead of their 2021 season. He made his professional debut on 1 May 2021, appearing as an 85th-minute substitute during a 3–0 win over Colorado Springs Switchbacks.

Wright signed with USL Championship side Rio Grande Valley FC on 23 February 2022.

References

1999 births
Living people
English footballers
Footballers from Greater London
Association football midfielders
Fulham F.C. players
Brentford F.C. players
San Antonio FC players
Rio Grande Valley FC Toros players
USL Championship players
USL League Two players
English expatriate footballers
Expatriate soccer players in the United States
English expatriate sportspeople in the United States
Corpus Christi FC players